The Canadian Senior Curling Championships are an annual bonspiel held to determine the national champions in senior curling for Canada. Seniors are defined as being people over the age of 50. The championship teams play at the World Senior Curling Championships the following year.

The event's first committee was established in October 1964. Frank Sargent was an original member of the senior championship committee, and believed the event would attract former Brier competitors and give seniors a place to compete which had not existed. The inaugural Canadian Seniors Curling Championship was hosted in Port Arthur in March 1965. It used a minimum age of 55 for competitors, and had the Seagram Company as its title sponsor.

Past champions

Men

Women

References

External links
Canadian Senior Curling Championships home

 
Senior
Senior curling
Recurring sporting events established in 1965
1965 establishments in Canada